Fernanda de Freitas Sahdo (born February 25, 1980) is a Brazilian actress.

Career 

Fernanda was a ballet teacher for 14 years. At age 19, she quit the gym where she worked as a ballet teacher and left her hometown of São José do Rio Preto, São Paulo, to go and live in Rio de Janeiro. In Rio, she began her career as one of the Zodiac Girls Planeta Xuxa program in 2000. She has done numerous advertising campaigns, working as a Ford agency model and studying theater at Casa de Arte das Laranjeiras.

She has made the cover of Melee, and did a test site for the Paparazzo.

Fernanda debuted as an actress in the Coração de Estudante, the role of Heloísa. Then in 2003 she took over the presentation of TV Globinho, along with other actresses.

On television, Fernando de Freitas also participated, novels Kubanacan (2003), Como uma Onda (2004), Bang Bang (2005), Pé na Jaca (2006), Negócio da China (2008).

The actress was in the A Turma do Didi, in the Malhação series, Casos e Acasos (2008), S.O.S. Emergência (2009/2010), in the special Por Toda a Minha Vida (2008), in the program Cilada (2009), in the miniseries Decamerão - A Comédia do Sexo (2009), Programa Piloto (2009).

In film, Fernanda debuted in Cidade Baixa (2005). Then he Zuzu Angel (2006), Tropa de Elite (2007), A Casa da Mãe Joana (2008), of Malu de Bicicleta (2011).

In the theater, Fernanda de Freitas served on A Ver Estrelas (2008).

In 2011, Fernanda de Freitas on the show Tapas & Beijos and continues to play Ensina-me a Viver, on display since 2008.

Filmography

Television

Film

Theater

References

External links 
 

1980 births
Living people
People from São José do Rio Preto
Brazilian television actresses
Brazilian telenovela actresses
Brazilian film actresses
Brazilian stage actresses